Emmanuel Henry Gomis Mendy (born 30 March 1990) is a professional footballer who plays as a right back.

Raised in Spain, he never played higher than Segunda División B, and had unsuccessful spells at clubs in four foreign countries, including Liverpool. Mendy was born in Senegal and chose to represent Guinea-Bissau at international level, making his debut in 2016 and being chosen for the 2017 Africa Cup of Nations.

Club career
Born in Medina Gounass, Senegal, Mendy emigrated to the Spanish town of Vícar, Almería as an infant and is a naturalised Spanish citizen. He began his career as a youth at Murcia Deportivo CF and was signed by Premier League club Liverpool in July 2008.

Mendy never made the senior team at Anfield and went to FC Dinamo Tbilisi in Georgia in 2012; he missed several months through an ankle injury after his first game and was then no longer required. He then spent an entire year unemployed before being signed by FK Daugava in Latvia. Having only been paid for two of five months' work for the Riga-based club, he returned to Spain and swore never to work abroad again.

After a spell at Tercera División club Huércal-Overa CF, Mendy went back abroad in early 2016 to play for CSM Ceahlăul Piatra Neamț in Liga II, a team who refused to pay their players anything more than a daily meal in a soup kitchen.  Having lost seven kilograms through the ordeal, he returned to Spain's fourth tier at CA Pulpileño. In January 2017, he moved up a level by signing for CD Eldense in Segunda División B, and caused a police investigation in April that year when he stated to Cadena SER that the club's assistant manager, Fran Ruiz, had told him to throw a game against FC Barcelona B.

International career
Mendy represents Guinea-Bissau at international level, becoming eligible through his  parents. He made his debut on 23 March 2016 in a 1–0 win away to Kenya in qualification for the 2017 Africa Cup of Nations. Due to the suspension of regular goalkeeper Jonas Acevedo, he used his connections to recommend Papa Massé Fall, another Senegalese-born player resident in Vícar, to be in goal for the next game against Zambia in June.

References

External links

1990 births
Living people
Senegalese people of Bissau-Guinean descent
Sportspeople of Bissau-Guinean descent
Senegalese footballers
Citizens of Guinea-Bissau through descent
Bissau-Guinean footballers
Guinea-Bissau international footballers
Senegalese expatriate footballers
Bissau-Guinean expatriate footballers
Association football fullbacks
Liverpool F.C. players
FC Dinamo Tbilisi players
FK Daugava (2003) players
Huércal-Overa CF players
CD Eldense footballers
CSM Ceahlăul Piatra Neamț players
CF Torre Levante players
Erovnuli Liga players
Segunda División B players
Tercera División players
Liga II players
Latvian Higher League players
Expatriate footballers in England
Expatriate footballers in Latvia
Expatriate footballers in Georgia (country)
Expatriate footballers in Romania
Expatriate footballers in Norway
Bissau-Guinean expatriate sportspeople in England
Bissau-Guinean expatriate sportspeople in Georgia (country)
Bissau-Guinean expatriates in Latvia
Bissau-Guinean expatriate sportspeople in Romania
Bissau-Guinean expatriate sportspeople in Norway
Senegalese emigrants to Spain
Naturalised citizens of Spain
Spanish sportspeople of African descent
Spanish people of Senegalese descent
Spanish people of Bissau-Guinean descent